

Denmark
Denmark proper
5 regions
98 municipalities
2 autonomous insular overseas dependencies
Faroe Islands
6 regions
30 municipalities
Greenland
5 municipalities
1 unincorporated national park

Finland
Finland
19 regions
Åland
70 sub-regions
310 municipalities

Iceland
Iceland
6 constituencies, electoral
8 regions, statistical
64 municipalities, administrative

Norway
Norway proper
11 counties
356 municipalities
overseas dependencies
2 unincorporated overseas dependencies
3 unintegrated overseas dependencies

Sweden
Sweden
21 counties
290 municipalities

References

Nordic countries